Banning books is not a common practice in Canada at the current time.

This is a short list of books once challenged by various libraries in Canada.

 The Hoax of the Twentieth Century
 Lethal Marriage
Lolita
The Naked and the Dead
Mein Kampf
Cities of the Red Night
Peyton Place
The Turner Diaries
White Niggers of America

See also
Censorship in Canada
List of books banned by governments

References

Censorship in Canada
Canada